FaceTime, Facetime or Face time may refer to:
 FaceTime, an Apple product
 Face time, social interaction
 FaceTime Communications - see Actiance
 FaceTime (song), a 21 Savage song from Issa Album
 Facetime (Ari Lennox song)